Hydnophytum is a genus of epiphytic myrmecophytes (ant plants) native to Southeast Asia, the Pacific region and also extending into Queensland in northern Australia. The name is derived from the Ancient Greek hydnon "tuber", and phyton "plant", after their appearance with their swollen succulent stems. The species grow in tree branches and on trunks.  Like the related genus Myrmecodia, they are known as antplants or ant-house plants. The type species is Hydnophytum formicarum from the Philippines. The genus contains 55 species, of which 44 are found in and around the island of New Guinea. Many are poorly known, with 11 known only from the holotype.

They form a symbiotic relationship with ants. Ant plants provide habitats for ant colonies high up into the forest canopy, protecting them from the elements and also predators because of the spines. Hollow, smooth-walled tunnels form within the caudex with external entrance holes, providing an above-ground home for ant colonies. Ants likewise provide defense for the plant and prevent tissue damage, swarming to defend their home if disturbed. Ant colonies also provide nutrients to the plants by leaving wastes within the tunnels inside the caudex. Special glands lining the tunnels then absorb nutriment for the plant. This symbiosis allows the plants to effectively gather nutrients (via the ants) from a much larger area than the roots ever could cover.

These plants can be grown in cultivation without the ant species being present. Two species seen occasionally in cultivation are Hydnophytum ferrugineum from the McIlwraith Ranges east of Coen on the Cape York Peninsula, and H. moseleyanum, also from Cape York. The former has a spiny swollen trunk while the latter has a smooth one.

Hydnophytum is one of five ant-plant genera in the family Rubiaceae, the others being Anthorrhiza, Myrmecodia, Myrmephytum, and Squamellaria.

Species
The following list, which includes more than 90 species, is based on The Plant List and likely includes many synonyms. Matthew Jebb and Camilla Huxley recognise only 55 species in the genus.

Hydnophytum agatifolium Valeton
Hydnophytum albense Valeton
Hydnophytum albertisii Becc.
Hydnophytum alboviride Merr. & L.M.Perry
Hydnophytum amboinense Becc.
Hydnophytum amplifolium S.Moore
Hydnophytum andamanense Becc.
Hydnophytum angustifolium Merr.
Hydnophytum archboldianum Merr. & L.M.Perry
Hydnophytum borneanum Becc.
Hydnophytum brachycladum Merr.
Hydnophytum bracteatum Valeton
Hydnophytum brassii S.Moore
Hydnophytum buxifolium Merr. & L.M.Perry
Hydnophytum caminiferum Wistuba, U.Zimm., Gronem. & Marwinski
Hydnophytum camporum S.Moore
Hydnophytum capitatum Valeton
Hydnophytum confertifolium Merr. & L.M.Perry
Hydnophytum contortum Merr. & L.M.Perry
Hydnophytum cordifolium Valeton
Hydnophytum coriaceum Becc.
Hydnophytum costatum Drake
Hydnophytum crassicaule P.Royen
Hydnophytum crassifolium Becc.
Hydnophytum cuneatum Valeton
Hydnophytum decipiens Merr. & L.M.Perry
Hydnophytum dipteropodum (K.Schum. & Lauterb.) Valeton
Hydnophytum dolichophyllum Valeton
Hydnophytum ellipticum Merr. & L.M.Perry
Hydnophytum ferrugineum P.I.Forst.
Hydnophytum forbesii Hook.f.
Hydnophytum formicarum Jack
Hydnophytum grandiflorum Becc.
Hydnophytum grandifolium Valeton
Hydnophytum guppyanum Becc.
Hydnophytum hahlii Rech.
Hydnophytum hellwigii Warb.
Hydnophytum heterophyllum Merr. & L.M.Perry
Hydnophytum inerme (Gaudich.) Bremek.
Hydnophytum intermedium Elmer
Hydnophytum kajewskii Merr. & L.M.Perry
Hydnophytum kejense Becc.
Hydnophytum kelelense Valeton
Hydnophytum kochii Valeton
Hydnophytum lanceolatum Miq.
Hydnophytum laurifolium Warb.
Hydnophytum lauterbachii Valeton
Hydnophytum ledermannii Valeton
Hydnophytum leytense Merr.
Hydnophytum linearifolium Valeton
Hydnophytum longiflorum A.Gray
Hydnophytum longipes Merr. & L.M.Perry
Hydnophytum longistylum Becc.
Hydnophytum loranthifolium (Benth.) Becc.
Hydnophytum lucidulum Valeton
Hydnophytum macrophyllum Warb.
Hydnophytum magnifolium Merr. & L.M.Perry
Hydnophytum membranaceum Merr.
Hydnophytum microphyllum Becc.
Hydnophytum mindanaense Elmer
Hydnophytum mindorense Merr.
Hydnophytum montis-kani Valeton
Hydnophytum moseleyanum Becc.
Hydnophytum myrtifolium Merr. & L.M.Perry
Hydnophytum nigrescens Merr. & L.M.Perry
Hydnophytum nitidum Merr.
Hydnophytum normale Becc.
Hydnophytum oblongum (Benth.) Becc.
Hydnophytum orbiculatum Elmer
Hydnophytum ovatum Miq.
Hydnophytum papuanum Becc.
Hydnophytum parvifolium Valeton
Hydnophytum petiolatum Becc.
Hydnophytum philippinense Becc.
Hydnophytum punamense Lauterb.
Hydnophytum radicans Becc.
Hydnophytum ramispinum Merr. & L.M.Perry
Hydnophytum robustum Rech.
Hydnophytum selebicum Becc.
Hydnophytum simplex Becc.
Hydnophytum spathulatum Valeton
Hydnophytum stenophyllum Valeton
Hydnophytum stewartii Fosberg
Hydnophytum subfalcifolium Valeton
Hydnophytum subnormale K.Schum.
Hydnophytum subrotundum Valeton
Hydnophytum subsessile Valeton
Hydnophytum sumatranum Becc.
Hydnophytum tetrapterum Becc.
Hydnophytum tortuosum Becc.
Hydnophytum vaccinifolium P.Royen
Hydnophytum virgatum Valeton
Hydnophytum vitis-idaea Merr. & L.M.Perry
Hydnophytum wilkinsonii Horne ex Baker
Hydnophytum zippelianum Becc.

Notes

Rubiaceae genera
Myrmecophytes
Epiphytes
Psychotrieae